Bacillus altitudinis is a species of bacteria first isolated from cryogenic tubes used for collecting air samples from high altitudes, hence its name. Its type strain is 41KF2bT (=MTCC 7306T =JCM 13350T).

References

Further reading

Sreeja, S. J., et al. "Optimization of cellulase production by Bacillus altitudinis APS MSU and Bacillus licheniformis APS2 MSU, gut isolates of fish Etroplus suratensis." (2013).

External links

LPSN
Type strain of Bacillus altitudinis at BacDive -  the Bacterial Diversity Metadatabase

altitudinis
Bacteria described in 2006